Narayani Stadium is the second largest stadium of Nepal with 15,000 capacity after Dasarath Rangasala Stadium but in terms of area, it is the largest in Nepal. It was built in 2038 B.S. It has conducted national games and sports of Nepal. It has also conducted some international friendly games.

It is located in Birgunj, Nepal. It is the regional track and field stadium of Central Development Region.

The stadium underwent renovations starting in December 2015.

References

Sports venues in Nepal
1981 establishments in Nepal
Buildings and structures in Parsa District